Jetpur is one of the 182 Legislative Assembly constituencies of Gujarat state in India. It is part of Rajkot district.

List of segments
This assembly seat represents the following segments,

 Jamkandorna Taluka
 Jetpur Taluka
 Vadia Taluka (Part) of Amreli District Village – Devalki

Members of Legislative Assembly
1998 - Savjibhai Korat, Bharatiya Janata Party
1999 (by-poll) - Jashuben Korat, Bharatiya Janata Party
2002 - Jashuben Korat, Bharatiya Janata Party
2007 - Jashuben Korat, Bharatiya Janata Party
2012 - Jayesh Radadiya, Indian National Congress
2013 (by-poll) - Jayesh Radadiya, Bharatiya Janata Party

Election results

2022

2017

'''

2013

See also
 List of constituencies of Gujarat Legislative Assembly
 Gujarat Legislative Assembly

References

External links
 

Assembly constituencies of Gujarat
Rajkot district